Ruatapu is a small town in the Westland District in the West Coast region of the South Island of New Zealand. The town's name stems from Ruatapu, a figure in Māori mythology. The town is located on a narrow strip of land between the Tasman Sea and Lake Mahinapua, a shallow lake that was originally a coastal lagoon.  runs through Ruatapu, connecting it to the nearby towns of Hokitika and Ross. The town's economy is based upon agriculture, as well as a large sawmill, operated by Westco Lagan, which mills Radiata Pine for further processing in Christchurch.

History

Railway 
On 9 November 1906, the Midland railway line, running from Greymouth to Hokitika, extended a branch line to Ruatapu. Ruatapu acted as the terminus of the railway until 1 April 1909, when it was opened to Ross, and became known as the Ross Branch. Passenger services ceased on 9 October 1972 and the line closed to all traffic on 24 November 1980. Some of the track bed near Ruatapu can now be driven.

Sawmill and tramway 
Joseph Butler bought  of rimu, matai and kahikatea bush, between Ruatapu and Ross, for £28,000 in 1907. With his brother William, he formed Butler Brothers Ltd, with the Kauri Timber Co as a major shareholder. A large steam-powered sawmill worked from 1911. A large storm in October 1915 ripped the roof off the sawmill, demolished a hut, and shifted another house from its foundations. An electric-powered mill was built in 1955 after the original had burnt down in 1952 and was rebuilt again after another fire in the early 1980s.

Fletcher Holdings took over the mill in 1961, sold it to Henderson & Pollard Ltd in 1979 and they became part of Carter Holt Harvey in 1987. In 1988 the mill was sold to Westco Lagan Ltd.

References

External links 
 1911 photo of interior of the timber mill
 1935 photo of train of logs
1958 one inch map showing tramways

Westland District
Populated places in the West Coast, New Zealand